The Weißensee Cemetery is a Jewish cemetery located in the neighborhood of Weißensee in Berlin, Germany. It is the second largest Jewish cemetery in Europe. It was dedicated in 1880.

The entrance
The main entrance is at the end of the Herbert-Baum-Straße. In 1924, a second entrance was constructed off Lichtenberger Straße (which was renamed Indira-Gandhi-Straße in 1985).

Directly in front of the entrance is a Holocaust memorial, a commemorative stone, surrounded by further stones, each with the names of concentration camps. Next to this, there is a memorial to Jews who lost their lives during World War I (which was dedicated in 1927) and also a commemorative plaque to those who fought Nazism.

Construction of the cemetery

The plot of land was bought by the Jewish community of Berlin, comprising – besides congregants of Orthodox and Reform affiliation – mostly observants of mainstream Judaism (in today's terms described at best as Conservative Judaism). The old Jewish cemetery in Große Hamburger Straße, opened 1672, had reached its full capacity in 1827. The second cemetery in Schönhauser Allee, opened in the same year, reached its capacity in the 1880s, offering only few remaining gravesites in family ensembles mostly reserved for widows and widowers next to their earlier deceased spouses. Weißensee Cemetery was designed by renowned German architect Hugo Licht in the Italian Neorenaissance style. It was inaugurated in 1880. The surrounding walls and main building (where the archives are kept and the cemetery is administered) were constructed with a distinctive yellow brick. A second building (built in 1910) was destroyed during World War II.

The grave plots are arranged into 120 different sections, each with its own geometric shape.  The lavish way in which the more well-to-do individuals and families interred here chose to fashion their mausoleums using the latest art nouveau designs is immediately noticeable.

The periphery of the cemetery is predominantly reserved for the upper and middle classes, while the center is occupied by the less well off, in areas which are harder to reach and often overgrown by foliage.

With the rise of Nazism the existence of the cemetery was at risk (many Jewish cemeteries in Europe were destroyed) but the site survived relatively unscathed. Some 4000 graves are estimated to have been damaged by Allied bombing.

Post-World War II

After World War II, Jews from all parts of Berlin continued to use the cemetery until 1955. Between 1955 and German reunification in 1990, only the small Jewish community in East Berlin used it.

During the four decades of the German Democratic Republic, the cemetery was relatively neglected because most of Berlin's Jewish community had been murdered during, or had fled from, the Holocaust. Many of the graves were left unattended and became overgrown with weeds.

In the 1970s, plans to build an expressway over part of the cemetery were considered, linking Michelangelostraße to the newly constructed Hansastraße.  This proposal was dropped due to strong objections from the remaining Jewish community.

It has been estimated by cemetery officials that the cost of fully repairing the damage caused by years of neglect would amount to 40 million euros. On the occasion of the cemetery's 125th anniversary, appeals were made to the Berlin government to increase funding, so that a bid can be made to add the site to the UNESCO world heritage list. The bid was supported by Berlin's former mayor Klaus Wowereit.

The cemetery is open to visitors, and the index of grave sites is largely intact.

Cemetery of the Orthodox congregation Adass Jisroel
About two kilometres northwest of the Weißensee Cemetery, in Wittlicher Straße also in the Weißensee locality, the Orthodox congregation Adass Jisroel has operated its own cemetery since 1873. So far it contains about 3,000 graves, including those of:
 Siegmund Breitbart
 Esriel Hildesheimer

Notable interments
 Hermann Aron, engineer
 Hans Aronson, physician
 Herbert Baum, anti-Fascist resistance fighter
 Micha Josef Berdyczewski, Hebrew scholar and journalist
 Oskar Cassel, politician
 Hermann Cohen, philosopher
 Julius Falkenstein, actor
 Samuel von Fischer, publisher, founder of the S. Fischer Verlag
 Richard Friedländer, businessman, adoptive father (and possibly biological father) of Magda Goebbels
 Josef Garbáty, cigarette manufacturer
 Nahum Gergel, Jewish activist, author and sociologist
 Eugen Goldstein, physicist
 Moritz Heimann, author and journalist
 Stefan Heym, author
 Max Hirsch, political economist and founder of the German trade unions
 Johannes Holzmann (pseudonym Senna Hoy), anarchist writer and activist
 Jacques Joseph, plastic surgeon
 Max Jaffe, biochemist
 Berthold Kempinski, Berlin wine merchant and founder of Kempinski Hotels
 Günter Kunert, writer
 Louis Lewandowski, composer
 Rudolf Mosse, newspaper publisher
 Benno Orenstein, industrialist
 Werner Scholem, member of the Reichstag
 Tom Seidmann-Freud, artist and writer
 Gustav Solomon Oppert, Indologist and Sanskritist
 Moritz Steinschneider, bibliographer and Orientalist
 Hermann Tietz, department store founder
 Wilhelm Traube, chemist
 Lesser Ury, painter
 Joseph Weizenbaum, computer scientist
 Theodor Wolff, author and journalist

Notes

1880 establishments in Germany
Buildings and structures in Pankow
Cemeteries in Berlin
History of Berlin
Holocaust memorials in Germany
Jewish cemeteries in Germany
Jews and Judaism in Berlin